Mechtildis may refer to:
Mechtildis of Edelstetten (d. 1160), Abbess and saint
Mechtildis of Helfta (d. 1298), Nun and saint